The 1951 Florida State Seminoles football team represented Florida State University as an independent in the 1951 college football season. Led by fourth-year head coach 6–2, the Seminoles compiled a record of 6–2. On October 5, Florida state played the Miami Hurricanes, losing 35–13. The game was the first meeting between the two schools and the beginning of the longstanding rivalry.

Schedule

References

Florida State
Florida State Seminoles football seasons
Florida State Seminoles football